The Demondrille railway station (pron. de MON drill) is a heritage-listed disused railway station on the Main South railway line in Murrumburrah, Hilltops Council, New South Wales, Australia. The station is located at the junction of the branch line to Cowra and Blayney with the Main South line. It consisted of a pair of island platforms, one on the mainline and one on the branchline, with a pair of signal boxes controlling the junction, which was formerly a triangle junction. The station opened in 1885 and closed in 1974. The platforms have been removed but the mainlines have not been straightened.

The remains of the railway precinct at Demondrille were added to the New South Wales State Heritage Register on 2 April 1999.

Locomotive Servicing Facility
During the years of steam locomotives, the Demondrille station precinct was a major online locomotive servicing facility. Trains could leave the main line and run through the facility and receive additional coal, undergo ash removal, and later receive water, without uncoupling from trains. The facility became operational between March and June 1923 and was upgraded for passenger trains in 1945. The coal stage was decommiossed after the last Up (i.e. towards Sydney) steam-hauled passender train on 20 June 1964, and the remaining coal removed three days later.

References

Disused regional railway stations in New South Wales
Railway stations in Australia opened in 1885
Railway stations closed in 1974
New South Wales State Heritage Register
Murrumburrah, New South Wales
Main Southern railway line, New South Wales
Blayney–Demondrille railway line